Westmark may refer to:

 Westmark (novel), a fantasy novel written by Lloyd Alexander
 Reichsgau Westmark, a planned Reichsgau of Nazi Germany, that included the former Territory of the Saar Basin, the Bavarian Palatinate and after 1940 the French département of Moselle in Lorraine (Lothringen)
 The Westmark School, a high school in Encino, California
 The «West Mark» or «West German Mark», an unofficial designation for the Deutsche Mark before the German Reunification of 1990.
 Westmark (name), a Swedish surname also popular in Finland and Denmark.
 Westmark Township, Phelps County, Nebraska, a township in Nebraska, USA
 Westmark hotel chain operating in Alaska and the Yukon, a division of Holland America Line.